The 2014–15 New Hampshire Wildcats women's basketball team represented the University of New Hampshire in the America East Conference. The Wildcats were led by fifth-year head coach Maureen Magarity and once again played their home games in Lundholm Gym. They finished the season 17–12, 9–7 in America East play to finish in fourth place. They lost in the quarterfinals of the America East women's tournament to Hartford. Despite finishing with 17 wins, they were not invited to a postseason tournament.

Media
All non-televised home games and conference road games streamed on either ESPN3 or AmericaEast.tv. Select home games aired on Fox College Sports, Live Well Network, or WBIN. Most road games streamed on the opponent's website. All conference home games and select non-conference home games were broadcast on the radio on WPKX, WGIR and online on the New Hampshire Portal.

Roster

Schedule

|-
!colspan=12 style="background:#00337F; color:#FFFFFF;"| Regular season

|-
!colspan=12 style="background:#FFFFFF; color:#00337F;"| 2015 America East tournament

See also
2014–15 New Hampshire Wildcats men's basketball team
New Hampshire Wildcats women's basketball

References

New Hampshire
New Hampshire Wildcats women's basketball seasons
New Hamp
New Hamp